Sarai Jattan is a village in Sultanpur Lodhi tehsil in Kapurthala district of Punjab, India. The village is administrated by a Sarpanch, who is an elected representative.

Demography 
According to the report published by Census India in 2011, Sarai Jattan has 136 houses with the total population of 678 persons of which 336 are male and 342 females. Literacy rate of Sarai Jattan is 68.14%, lower than the state average of 75.84%.  The population of children in the age group 0–6 years is 91 which is 13.42% of the total population.  Child sex ratio is approximately 1022, higher than the state average of 846.

Population data

Work Profile 
In Sarai Jattan village out of total population, 219 were engaged in work activities.  73.52% of workers describe their work as Main Work (Employment or Earning more than 6 Months) while 26.48% were involved in Marginal activity providing livelihood for less than 6 months. Of 219 workers engaged in Main Work, 71 were cultivators (owner or co-owner) while 50 were Agricultural labourer.

Caste 
In Sarai Jattan village, most of the villagers are from Schedule Caste (SC). Schedule Caste (SC) constitutes  42.18% of total population in Sarai Jattan village. The village Sarai Jattan currently doesn’t have any Schedule Tribe (ST) population.

List of cities near the village 
Bhulath
Kapurthala 
Phagwara 
Sultanpur Lodhi

Air travel connectivity 
The closest International airport to the village is Sri Guru Ram Dass Jee International Airport.

References

External links
 Villages in Kapurthala

Villages in Kapurthala district
Caravanserais in India